State Highway 44 (SH-44) is a  state highway in the U.S. State of Idaho. SH-44 travels through the Treasure Valley from Interstate 84 (I-84) to U.S. Route 20 (US-20) and US-26 in Garden City, Idaho.

Route description
State Highway 44 starts at the junction of Interstate 84 north of Caldwell at Exit 25. The highway heads eastward staying mostly to the north of the Boise River. The highway goes through the cities of Middleton and Star. Just to the east of Star meets its junction with Emmett Highway, SH-16. Highway 44 continues east through Eagle and intersects with State Highway 55. From Eagle eastward, the highway is also known as State Street and continues toward Boise. The highway turns southward onto Glenwood Street in Garden City where it continues for approximately  before ending at Chinden Boulevard (US-20/US-26).

History
This route is believed to have been in existence since 1934. A previous alignment of State Highway 44 continued eastward down State Street past Glenwood Street further into downtown Boise. The highway turned south onto 23rd Street and continued several blocks to Fairview Avenue which, at the time, was also US-20, US-26 and US-30. State Highway 44 was also cosigned with State Highway 55 from Horseshoe Bend Road east to its terminus at Fairview Ave in Boise. There, SH-55 turned west and followed the US-20/26/30 complex to Interstate 184.

Future
A study is currently being conducted by ITD and Compass (the Boise area MPO) to determine the future transportation needs of this facility and to preserve the right of way for possible future widening of the highway and bypass alternatives through the cities of Middleton and Star.

Major intersections

References

044
Transportation in Canyon County, Idaho
Transportation in Ada County, Idaho